Summer Love Love ( or ) is a Chinese/Hong Kong romantic comedy film directed by Wilson Kwok-wai Chin and starring Alex Fong, Owodog, Terence Siufay, Elanne Kong, Viann Zhang, Izumi Liu, and Carol Yeung. It was released on 23 August 2011.

Cast
 Alex Fong as Xiao Fangfang
 Owodog as Nuannuan
 Viann Zhang as Xiaoyu
 Carol Yeung as Carol
 Terence Siufay as Xiaofei
 Elanne Kong as Xiaolin.
 Izumi Liu as Qiqi.

Production
This film was shot in Sanya, Hainan, China.

References

External links

Chinese romantic comedy films
Hong Kong romantic comedy films
2010s Mandarin-language films
2011 romantic comedy films
2011 films
2010s Hong Kong films